Rubia is the type  genus of the Rubiaceae family of flowering plants, which also contains coffee. It contains around 80 species of perennial scrambling or climbing herbs and subshrubs native to the Old World. The genus and its best-known species are commonly known as madder, e.g. Rubia tinctorum (common madder), Rubia peregrina (wild madder), and Rubia cordifolia (Indian madder).

Uses

Rubia was an economically important source of a red pigment in many regions of Asia, Europe and Africa. The genus name Rubia derives from the Latin  meaning "red".

The plant's roots contain an anthracene compound called alizarin that gives its red colour to a textile dye known as Rose madder. It was also used as a colourant, especially for paint, that is referred to as Madder lake. The synthesis of alizarin greatly reduced demand for the natural compound.

In Georgia, Rubia is used for dying Easter eggs in red.

History
Several species, such as Rubia tinctorum in Europe, Rubia cordifolia in India, and Rubia argyi in East Asia, were extensively cultivated from antiquity until the mid nineteenth century for red dye, commonly called madder. Cloth dyed with it has been found on Egyptian mummies. It was the ereuthedanon used for dyeing the cloaks of the Libyan women in the days of Herodotus. It is the erythrodanon of Pedanius Dioscorides, who wrote of its cultivation in Caria, and of Hippocrates, and the Rubia of Pliny. R. tinctorum was extensively cultivated in south Europe, France, where it is called garance, and the Netherlands, and to a small extent in the United States. Large quantities were imported into England from Smyrna, Trieste, Livorno, etc. The cultivation, however, decreased after alizarin was made artificially.

Madder was employed medicinally in ancient civilizations and in the Middle Ages. John Gerard, in 1597, wrote of it as having been cultivated in many gardens in his day, and describes its many supposed virtues, but any pharmacological or therapeutic action which madder may possess is unrecognizable. Its most remarkable physiological effect was found to be that of colouring red the bones of animals fed upon it, as also the claws and beaks of birds. This appears to be due to the chemical affinity of calcium phosphate for the colouring matter. This property was used to enable physiologists to ascertain the manner in which bones develop, and the functions of the various types of cell found in growing bone.

Species

 Rubia agostinhoi Dans. & P.Silva
 Rubia aitchisonii Deb & Malick
 Rubia alaica Pachom.
 Rubia alata Wall.
 Rubia albicaulis Boiss.
 Rubia angustisissima Wall. ex G.Don
 Rubia argyi (H.Lév. & Vaniot) Hara ex Lauener
 Rubia atropurpurea Decne.
 Rubia balearica (Willk.) Porta
 Rubia caramanica Bornm.
 Rubia charifolia Wall. ex G.Don
 Rubia chinensis Regel & Maack
 Rubia chitralensis Ehrend.
 Rubia clematidifolia Blume ex Decne.
 Rubia cordifolia L.
 Rubia crassipes Collett & Hemsl.
 Rubia cretacea Pojark.
 Rubia danaensis Danin
 Rubia davisiana Ehrend.
 Rubia deserticola Pojark.
 Rubia discolor Turcz.
 Rubia dolichophylla Schrenk
 Rubia edgeworthii Hook.f.
 Rubia falciformis H.S.Lo
 Rubia filiformis F.C.How ex H.S.Lo
 Rubia florida Boiss.
 Rubia fruticosa Aiton
 Rubia garrettii Craib
 Rubia gedrosiaca Bornm.
 Rubia haematantha Ary Shaw
 Rubia hexaphylla (Makino) Makino
 Rubia himalayensis Klotzsch
 Rubia hispidicaulis D.G.Long
 Rubia horrida (Thunb.) Puff
 Rubia infundibularis Hemsl. & Lace
 Rubia jesoensis (Miq.) Miyabe & Kudo
 Rubia komarovii Pojark.
 Rubia krascheninnikovii Pojark.
 Rubia laevissima Tschern.
 Rubia latipetala H.S.Lo
 Rubia laurae (Holmboe) Airy Shaw
 Rubia laxiflora Gontsch.
 Rubia linii J.M.Chao
 Rubia magna P.G.Xiao
 Rubia mandersii Collett & Hemsl.
 Rubia manjith Roxb. ex Fleming
 Rubia maymanensis Ehrend. & Schönb.-Tem.
 Rubia membranacea Diels
 Rubia oncotricha Hand.-Mazz.
 Rubia oppositifolia Griff.
 Rubia ovatifolia Z.Ying Zhang ex Q.Lin
 Rubia pallida Diels
 Rubia pauciflora Boiss.
 Rubia pavlovii Bajtenov & Myrz.
 Rubia peregrina L.
 Rubia petiolaris DC.
 Rubia philippinensis Elmer
 Rubia podantha Diels
 Rubia polyphlebia H.S.Lo
 Rubia pterygocaulis H.S.Lo
 Rubia rechingeri Ehrend.
 Rubia regelii Pojark.
 Rubia rezniczenkoana Litv.
 Rubia rigidifolia Pojark.
 Rubia rotundifolia Banks & Sol.
 Rubia salicifolia H.S.Lo
 Rubia schugnanica B.Fedtsch. ex Pojark.
 Rubia schumanniana E.Pritz.
 Rubia siamensis Craib
 Rubia sikkimensis Kurz
 Rubia sylvatica (Maxim.) Nakai
 Rubia tatarica (Trevir.) F.Schmidt
 Rubia tenuifolia d'Urv.
 Rubia tenuissima ined.
 Rubia thunbergii DC.
 Rubia tibetica Hook.f.
 Rubia tinctorum L.
 Rubia transcaucasica Grossh.
 Rubia trichocarpa H.S.Lo
 Rubia truppeliana Loes.
 Rubia wallichiana Decne.
 Rubia yunnanensis Diels

References

External links

 Rubia in the World Checklist of Rubiaceae

 
Medicinal plants
Non-timber forest products
Plant dyes
Rubiaceae genera
Rugs and carpets